Riverview High School is a four-year public high school in Sarasota, Florida, United States. Riverview educates students from ninth grade to twelfth grade. The school has 2,654 students and 129 teachers. The school's mascot is the ram. As of the 2012–2013 school year, it is the largest school in the county.

Notable programs at the school include the International Baccalaureate Program, a rigorous regimen that prepares its candidates on an international rubric and prepares them for further education; a Chamber Choir that has performed in Europe and New York's Carnegie Hall; and the Riverview High School Kiltie Band, a group of about 220 musicians that has marched three times in the Macy's Thanksgiving Day parade and has traveled to perform in Ireland, California, and many other places. .

The Rudolph building, 1958-2009 
Riverview's old main building opened in 1958, and included a planetarium. The main building was designed by noted International Style architect Paul Rudolph, dean of the Yale School of Architecture. While Rudolph was later associated with the architectural style Brutalism, Riverview was in the International Style. It was one of the best-known structures associated with the Sarasota School of Architecture, sometimes referred to as Sarasota Modern.

In 2006, Sarasota County approved spending an estimated $130 million on the reconstruction of the school, which would include demolition of the Rudolph building. The new high school building would increase classroom space and bring the school's facilities up to date. The Rudolph structures would be replaced with a big parking lot.

The building's critics contended that Rudolph's roof design, which was intended to make runoff water resemble a "waterfall," caused water to pool dangerously in the hallways. School officials also asserted that mold was an ongoing problem. Proponents for restoration of the buildings cited that inappropriate alterations to the original design had created some of the problems and that proper maintenance had been deferred as well, making the problems seem much greater, but that remedial action was feasible.

The demolition plans were opposed by historic preservationists, including the directors of the Sarasota Architectural Foundation, the directors of the Sarasota Alliance for Historic Preservation, the founder of Friends of Seagate, and the president-elect of American Institute of Architects, Florida.

Riverview High School was placed on the Florida Trust for Historic Preservation's list of the most endangered historic sites and was nominated for placement on the National Trust for Historic Preservation 2007 list of the America's Most Endangered Places. It was also placed on the World Monuments Fund's 2008 List of 100 Most Endangered Sites in the listing "Main Street Modern."

At a January 2007 Sarasota public meeting, Kafi Benz, the founder of Friends of Seagate asked Andres Duany to relate the prevailing international opinion regarding the demolition plans for Riverview High School. In what time would prove overstatement, he said that Sarasota's reputation as a leader in the arts would be destroyed, forever, if demolition of this significant structure were allowed. In February 2007, and after pressure from the National Trust for Historic Preservation, the school board agreed to consider new options in lieu of demolition.

Considering the international concern expressed about the cultural value of the buildings, as well as the actions of a local organization formed to advance alternative plans for the new development that would include restoration of the Rudolph structures and placing the parking lot intended to replace it under the athletic fields, on March 20, 2007 the school board announced that it would allow a year for consideration of implementation of alternative proposals. This followed a charrette conducted locally by the National Trust for Historic Preservation, where the plan for relocating the parking lot was proposed.

The office of architect Carl Abbott, FAIA, who is considered a member of the Sarasota School of Architecture, released information about a co-operative effort by the Save Riverview Committee, the Florida Association of Architects, and the Sarasota Architectural Foundation, at which the documentary Site Specific: The History of Regional Modernism, by Susan Szenasy, editor in chief of Metropolis magazine, was previewed on March 24 at Burns Court Cinema in Sarasota. In the film, Szenasy explored the historic significance of Riverview High School and featured expressions of the concern of architects around the world compared with the designer of the new campus and a maintenance staff member at the school. The film was intended for a lecture tour of the United States by Szenasy, who planned to discuss the issues of historic preservation, community history, and the education of students.

On June 17, 2008, however, the school board voted three to two to raze Rudolph's structure, with members Frank Kovach, Caroline Zucker and Shirley Brown making the majority vote. It was demolished in June 2009, and the new school building opened in August of the same year.

Notable alumni 

 Sharyl Attkisson – American television journalist
 David Baas – Former American football player (center) with the New York Giants.
 Mike Bell - Baseball coach
 Bob Buchanan – Former professional baseball player (Cincinnati Reds, Kansas City Royals).
 Todd Combs – Hedge fund manager who has been tapped as a potential successor of Warren Buffett as the chief investment officer of Berkshire Hathaway 
 Joe DePastino – Former professional baseball player (New York Mets) and former minor league Manager of the West Michigan Whitecaps. 
 Luis Elizondo – Former Military intelligence officer, UFO/UAP disclosure advocate.
 Tony Green (American football) - American Football player
 Chris Hannon – Former American Football player (wide receiver).
 Karan Higdon – American football player
 Mike Hiss – Racing car driver in the USAC Championship Car series, finishing 7th in the Indianapolis 500 in 1972, and winning the "rookie of the Year" title.
 Amy Holton - American tennis player.
 David Howard – Former professional baseball player (Kansas City Royals, St. Louis Cardinals)and former minor league hitting coach.
 Amarri Jackson - American football player
 Richie James - American football player for the San Francisco 49ers
 Jamar Johnson - American football player
 Todd Johnson – Former American football player (safety), current Riverview High School head football coach.
 Neil Larsen - American jazz keyboardist, musical arranger and composer
 Troy Mattes – Former professional baseball player (Montreal Expos) and former minor league pitching coach.
 Drew Miller - American football offensive lineman for the Jacksonville Jaguars and St. Louis Rams
 Guy Peterson - American architect
 Kyle Snyder – Former professional baseball player (Kansas City Royals, Boston Red Sox and current pitching coach of the Tampa Bay Rays. 
 Chad Sobotka - American professional baseball pitcher for the Milwaukee Brewers and Atlanta Braves.
 Davide Somma – Former Soccer player, with Leeds United
 Howard  Tayler - American cartoonist and creator of Schlock Mercenary.
 Courtney Watson - American football linebacker with the New Orleans Saints
 Emma Weyant - US national champion and Olympic medley swimmer. Emma finished first in the 500-yard freestyle at the 2022 NCAA Division I Women's Swimming and Diving Championships with a time of 4:34:99.

Gallery

References

External links

 
 Riverview High School IB Program
 Riverview High School Foundation webpage
 The Paul Rudolph Institute for Modern Architecture - formerly the Paul Rudolph Heritage Foundation, a non-profit organization representing the Paul Rudolph estate, dedicated to communicating, preserving and extending Paul Rudolph's legacy with an online archive of over 13,000 images in addition to written and biographical materials.
 The Riverview High School Project Page from the Paul Rudolph Institute for Modern Architecture archives
 National AIA Resolution to Support Historic Preservation of Riverview High School

High schools in Sarasota County, Florida
Educational institutions established in 1958
International style architecture in Florida
Modernist architecture in Florida
Public high schools in Florida
Paul Rudolph buildings
1958 establishments in Florida